Barney McLean (December 23, 1917 – July 19, 2005) was an American alpine skier. He competed in three events at the 1948 Winter Olympics.

References

1917 births
2005 deaths
American male alpine skiers
Olympic alpine skiers of the United States
Alpine skiers at the 1948 Winter Olympics
People from Lander, Wyoming